Ashley Gavin is an American comedian, writer, and podcast host. She is known for her podcast, We're Having Gay Sex. She also has a podcast with Alayna Joy and Makaela Ingemi called "Chosen Family".

Education
Gavin graduated with a Bachelor's degree from Bryn Mawr College. She graduated Magna Cum Laude with honors in Computer Science.

We're Having Gay Sex
Women's Health rated We're Having Gay Sex as one of the top best LGBTQ+ podcasts to listen to in 2021 and Buzzfeed named it one of the best queer podcasts. Guests such as Demi Burnett from The Bachelor, Francesca Farago from Too Hot To Handle, and news anchor Megan Mitchell have appeared on the podcast. The podcast was listed as one of the best comedy podcasts of 2020 by Paste Magazine.

Comedy
Gavin is a New York based comedian and runs a weekly show Sunday Sqool Comedy. She has toured throughout the United States and was Carnival Cruiseline’s first openly gay comedian.

Acting
Gavin stars in the series “Gay Girl Straight Girl (GGSG)”.

Personal life
Gavin is a lesbian. Her father died of cancer when she was 11 years old. Gavin lives in New York. Gavin played the role of the pharaoh in her eighth grade production of “Joseph and the Technicolor Dream Coat.” Prior to pursuing comedy, Gavin worked as a software engineer at MIT Lincoln Lab. Eventually she became a computer science educator, serving as the founding curriculum director of Girls Who Code and as an adjunct faculty member at Wesleyan University.

References

External links

Living people
Bryn Mawr College alumni
American women comedians
American women podcasters
American podcasters
American lesbian writers
Lesbian comedians
Comedians from New York City
LGBT people from New York (state)
21st-century American LGBT people
21st-century American women writers
1987 births